Goodbye Blue Sky is the seventh and final studio album by Godley & Creme. Released in 1988, the album generated two singles, "A Little Piece of Heaven" (a top 30 hit in several countries across Europe) and "10,000 Angels", as well as videos for those two singles.

The album featured backup vocals by three future members of 1990s dance band Londonbeat.

Making of 
The album is notable through its use of harmonicas, which are used substantially on most tracks.

In a 1988 interview with Pulse! magazine , they said:

Track listing 
All songs composed by Kevin Godley and Lol Creme

 "H.E.A.V.E.N. / A Little Piece of Heaven" – 5:06
 "Don't Set Fire (To the One I Love)" – 3:27
 "Golden Rings" – 4:17
 "Crime & Punishment" – 7:22
 "The Big Bang" – 2:32
 "10,000 Angels" – 5:16
 "Sweet Memory" – 4:50
 "Airforce One" – 3:40
 "The Last Page of History" – 4:01
 "Desperate Times" – 3:41

Personnel 
 Lol Creme – guitar, bass, keyboard & vocals
 Kevin Godley – drums, percussion, vocals
 Mark Feltham – harmonica
 Mitt Gamon – harmonica
 Jimmy Chambers – backup vocals
 George Chandler – backup vocals
 Jimmy Helms – backup vocals
 Richard Evans - Cover design

References

1988 albums
Godley & Creme albums
Polydor Records albums